Harry "Henry" Hore (born 17 August 1999), is an Australian professional footballer who plays as a attacking midfielder for Brisbane Roar.

References

External links

Living people
1999 births
Australian soccer players
Association football midfielders
Brisbane Roar FC players
Perth Glory FC players
South Melbourne FC players
A-League Men players
National Premier Leagues players
People from Nambour, Queensland